Violin Sonata No. 17 in C Major, K. 296, was composed by Wolfgang Amadeus Mozart on 11 March 1778 in Mannheim, Germany and was first published in 1781 as part of Mozart's Opus 2 collection. It is the first work of his 'mature sonatas' (those not written in his childhood), which were written between 1778 and 1788. The work was dedicated to Josepha Barbara Auernhammer.

The work consists of three movements:

This work is written in the style popular in Mannheim, as Mozart was impressed upon playing the violin sonatas of Joseph Schuster, noting that they were “very popular” in Mannheim.

References

External links 

Performance of Violin Sonata No. 17 by Benjamin Beilman (violin) and Yekwon Sunwoo (piano) from the Isabella Stewart Gardner Museum in MP3 format

296
1778 compositions
Compositions in C major